Desoto is an unincorporated community in Delaware Township, Delaware County, Indiana.

History
DeSoto was platted in 1881.

Geography

References

Unincorporated communities in Delaware County, Indiana
Unincorporated communities in Indiana